Ab Chenar-e Sofla (also Romanized as Āb Chenār-e Soflá) is a village in Barez Rural District, Manj District, Lordegan County, Chaharmahal and Bakhtiari Province, Iran. At the 2006 census, its population was 814, in 133 families.

References 

Populated places in Lordegan County